Concord West (also known as West Concord) is a suburb on the periphery of Sydney's inner-west, in the state of New South Wales, Australia. Concord West is located 16 km west of the Sydney central business district, in the local government area of the City of Canada Bay. Concord is a separate suburb, to the east.

Concord West is bordered on the west by Rhodes, Liberty Grove and Homebush Bay; to the south by North Strathfield and Homebush; and to the east by Concord, Breakfast Point, Cabarita and Mortlake. It shares the postcode of 2138 with Rhodes.

The suburb takes its namesake from the town of Concord, Massachusetts in the United States of America.

History
Concord takes its name from Concord, Massachusetts, in the United States. It was the site of the Battle of Concord, the first military engagements of the American Revolutionary War (1775–1778). Some historians believe the suburb was named Concord, to encourage a peaceful attitude between soldiers and settlers. The first land grants in the area were made in 1793.

Concord West was under the jurisdiction of Concord Council, until it amalgamated with Drummoyne Council in 2000 to form the City of Canada Bay. The surrounding parish is also named Concord Parish.

A major historical figure in the area was Thomas Walker (1804–1886), a philanthropist who lived in the Victorian Italianate mansion, Yaralla, on the shores of Parramatta River. When he died, Walker left substantial funds for the establishment of a convalescent hospital in the area. The hospital—known as the Thomas Walker Hospital—was designed by Sir John Sulman in the Federation Free Classical style and built on a large site north-west of Yaralla. It is now listed on the Register of the National Estate. Since the late 1970s, it has functioned as Rivendell Child, Adolescent and Family Unit, which specialises in the treatment of young people with psychological problems.

Walker's philanthropic work was continued by his daughter Dame Eadith Walker (1861–1937), who was awarded a Commander of the Order of the British Empire in 1919, and was made a Dame 1929. The family home, Yaralla, eventually became the Dame Eadith Walker Hospital; like the Thomas Walker Hospital, it was listed on the Register of the National Estate. Dame Eadith also aided in establishing the Concord Repatriation General Hospital.

The portion of Concord north and west of Concord Golf Club and Majors Bay Reserve was designated a separate suburb under the name "Concord West" and gazetted in 1993.

Heritage listings 
Concord West has a number of heritage-listed sites, including:
 Hospital Road: Thomas Walker Convalescent Hospital Buildings
 The Drive: Yaralla Estate

Commercial area
Concord West has a group of shops beside Concord West railway station. Another commercial area is located along Concord Road.

Visitors site
The Kokoda Track Memorial Walkway is a Walkway located near the repatriation Hospital which commemorates the Australian soldiers who participated in the New Guinea campaign during the Second World War.

Health
Concord West is home to one of Sydney's major hospitals, Concord Repatriation General Hospital (commonly known as Concord Hospital). Concord Hospital has its own postcode, 2139.

The hospital grounds, particularly around the Dame Edith Walker Hospital in the Yaralla Estate to the south, contain some remnants of critically endangered Sydney Turpentine-Ironbark Forest in a relatively intact state.

Transport
Concord West railway station is on the Northern Line of the Sydney Trains network.

There are also various Buses which service in and around the concord west area.

Churches
St. Ambrose Catholic Church

Pop culture
 Concord Repatriation General Hospital provides the external shots for the fictional All Saints General Western Hospital in the Australian television drama series All Saints.
 Australian mini series Bangkok Hilton was partly filmed in the grounds of the Thomas Walker Convalescent Hospital. 
Hollywood blockbuster Superman Returns features shots of Rivendell Hospital, portraying Vanderworth Mansion.

Population

Demographics
According to the 2016 census, there were 5,914 residents in Concord West. The most common ancestries in Concord West were Australian 16.9%, English 15.5%, Italian 13.8%, Chinese 9.1% and Irish 7.7%.  63.0% of people were born in Australia. The next most common countries of birth were China 4.9%, Italy 4.1%, South Korea 2.2% and India 1.9%. 60.3% of people spoke only English at home. Other languages spoken at home included Italian 7.8%, Mandarin 4.9%, Cantonese 3.6%, Greek 3.5% and Korean 2.8%. The most common responses for religion were Catholic 43.0%, No Religion 18.9% and Anglican 8.2%.

Notable residents
 Sydney Weekender host Mike Whitney 
 Award-winning journalist Reagan Murphy attended Concord West Public School (1968–72) and 1st Concord West Scouts.  
 Olympic bronze medalist David Anderson attended Concord West Public School 1940–1943.

References

Suburbs of Sydney
City of Canada Bay